Armando Cossutta (2 September 1926 – 14 December 2015) was an Italian communist politician.

Biography
Born in Milan, Cossutta joined the Italian Communist Party (PCI) in 1943, and took part in the Italian resistance movement as a partisan. After World War II, he became one of the leading members of the party, representing the most pro-Soviet Union tendency; his belief in that country as the "Leading state" of communism led him to criticize Enrico Berlinguer. Later in life, although he did not regret the choice he made, Cossutta considered that he was mistaken in opposing Berlinguer.

Opposed to Achille Occhetto's 1991 proposal to dissolve the PCI, he founded, together with Sergio Garavini, Nichi Vendola and some others, the Communist Refoundation Party, of which he became the president. When Fausto Bertinotti, secretary of the party, voted against a motion of confidence to the 1996 government of Romano Prodi, Cossutta opposed his stance, and left the party along with Oliviero Diliberto and others to found the Party of Italian Communists.

Afterwards, Cossutta was president of the Party of Italian Communists, and Member of Parliament. He also served as Member of the European Parliament during the 5th European term (1999–2004). He died on 14 December 2015 in Rome.

He was an atheist.

Post-Cold War allegations
In 1991, a Russian journalist claimed, by citing documents from the Communist Party, that Cossutta received more than 2 million dollars from Russia, for propaganda reasons, during the 1980s. Cossutta dismissed these claims though, saying that he "had never received money from the Soviet Union."

In 1999, Cossutta appeared on a list of alleged Italian KGB spies.

References

Works
Vecchio e nuovo corso. Vangelista, Milan.
Dissenso e unità. Teti, Milan, 1986.
Una storia comunista (with Gianni Montesano). Rizzoli, Milan, 2004.

External links

1926 births
2015 deaths
Italian resistance movement members
Italian Communist Party politicians
Communist Refoundation Party politicians
Politicians from Milan
Italian atheists
Communist Refoundation Party MEPs
MEPs for Italy 1999–2004
Party of Italian Communists politicians
Members of the Senate of the Republic (Italy)